The Mandell Weiss Theatre is located on the campus of the University of California San Diego in La Jolla, California. The Center houses La Jolla Playhouse events.

History 
La Jolla Playhouse played at a prior venue and moved here in 1991 when opened.

External links 
Mandell Weiss Theatre

University of California, San Diego
Performing arts centers in California
Culture of San Diego
Buildings and structures in San Diego